Cissuvora is a genus of moths in the family Sesiidae.

Species
Cissuvora ampelopsis (Engelhardt, 1946)
Cissuvora sinensis Wang & Yang, 2002

References

Sesiidae